Cryomonadida is a group of heterotrophic Rhizaria, that belong to the Cercozoa.

Characteristics
Members of the Cryomonadida are single-celled organisms that are surrounded by a shell comprising layers of organic material. They possess two unequally long flagella, and a single nucleus with a distinct nucleolus. They have a laterally located cytostome, from which pseudopodia arise.

Systematics
The order Cryomonadida was erected in 1993 for the genus Cryothecomonas. In 2005, Sina Adl et al. did not include the order in their classification, but placed the genus incertae sedis among the Cercozoa. It became clear, however, that other genera, and taxa known only from environmental DNA, belonged in this group, and so in 2008 Jan Pawlowski placed the Cryomonadida as part of the core Cercozoa.

Within the Cercozoa, the sister taxon to Cryomonadida is Ebriacea; Pseudodifflugia is also closely related.

The following genera are included:
 Family Rhogostomidae Dumack et al. 2017
 Sacciforma Dumack et al. 2017
 Capsellina Penard 1909
 Rhogostoma Belar 1921 (previously misidentified as Lecythium)
 Family Protaspidae Cavalier-Smith 1993 [Cryothecomonadidae Cavalier-Smith 1993]
 Cryothecomonas Thomsen et al. 1991
 Protaspa Cavalier-Smith 2011 [Protaspis Skuja 1939 non Bryant 1933]
 Sinistermonas Lee 2015

References

Cercozoa orders
Thecofilosea